Steve Larder (born 5 March 1963) is an Australian former professional rugby league footballer who played in the 1980s and 1990s.

Background

Playing career

County Cup Final appearances
Steve Larder played  in Castleford's 11-8 victory over Wakefield Trinity in the 1990 Yorkshire County Cup Final during the 1990–91 season at Elland Road, Leeds on Sunday 23 September 1990.

Club career
Steve Larder signed for Castleford from Illawarra Steelers on Saturday 1 July 1989, and made his début for Castleford in the 20-22 defeat by Featherstone Rovers on Tuesday 3 September 1989.

References

External links
 
Steve Larder Memory Box Search at archive.castigersheritage.com

1963 births
Living people
Australian rugby league players
Castleford Tigers players
Illawarra Steelers players
Rugby league fullbacks
Rugby league players from Darwin, Northern Territory
Rugby league wingers